The Nationalsozialistische Monatshefte (National Socialist Monthly) was a political and cultural journal produced by the Nazi Party and edited by Adolf Hitler (1930–October 1933) and then, by Alfred Rosenberg (May 1935–1944). Its first edition was published in 1930. It served as a forum for specialists of various academic disciplines, including linguistics and history, to present their research in a popular format, often with a racial emphasis. The magazine, based in Munich, ceased publication in 1944.

References

1930 establishments in Germany
1944 disestablishments in Germany
Defunct political magazines published in Germany
Fascist newspapers and magazines
German-language magazines
Magazines established in 1930
Magazines disestablished in 1944
Magazines published in Munich
Monthly magazines published in Germany
Nazi culture